Irene Roberts (born February 26, 1983) is an American mezzo-soprano.

Early life and education
Irene Roberts was born and raised in Sacramento, California and attended the Sacramento Waldorf School before earning her undergraduate degree from the University of the Pacific and her master's degree from the Cleveland Institute of Music.  She won 2nd prize in the Advanced Division at the 41st Annual Palm Beach Opera Vocal Competition and was a finalist for the 2014 Richard Tucker Career Grant.

Career
Irene Roberts made her Metropolitan Opera debut in The Marriage of Figaro in 2012, and in 2013 debuted at San Francisco Opera in Les Contes d'Hoffmann.

Since 2015 she has been a member of the ensemble of the Deutsche Oper Berlin where she has performed roles including The Muse/Nicklausse in Offenbach's Les Contes d'Hoffmann, the title role of Bizet's Carmen, Hansel in Humperdink's Hansel and Gretel, and Urbain in Meyerbeer's Les Huguenots.

In 2016 she created the role of Bao Chai in the world premiere of Bright Sheng's Dream of the Red Chamber at San Francisco Opera. She also made her London recital debut at Wigmore Hall with tenor Bryan Hymel.

Roberts made her debut in Amsterdam as The Muse in a new production of Les Contes d'Hoffmann in 2018. In 2019 she made her house debut at La Fenice in Venice with her first performances of Amneris in Verdi's Aida.

Repertory

Personal life
Irene Roberts lives in Berlin with her husband and two children.

References

Living people
American mezzo-sopranos
American operatic mezzo-sopranos
1983 births
21st-century American women singers
People from Sacramento, California
21st-century American singers
Singers from California
Classical musicians from California